The Afrotropical mosquito genus Eretmapodites contains species that exhibit facultative cannibalism in their larval developmental stages. The species was first described in 1901 by Frederick Vincent Theobald. The type species is Eretmapodites quinquevittatus Theobald

Bionomics

Eretmapodites larvae feed primarily on decaying organic matter, but become cannibalistic when other food becomes scarce, and sometimes even in the presence of abundant other food material.

Larval breeding-places include small collections of water in larger fallen leaves, old tins and bottles, snail shells, plant axils, cut bamboo, and rarely tree holes. Some species seem to breed exclusively in plant axils; the majority are most frequently found in fallen leaves in forest habitat. They are strongly bottom-dwelling, so much so that when the water is poured out of a leaf containing them, most remain on the surface of the leaf until washed off; larvae of species collected in Uganda and Sierra Leone have been observed crawling over the surface of the leaf.

When they become cannibalistic, they are predatory on other mosquito larvae, aquatic larvae of other small Diptera, and aquatic oligochaetes and nematodes. Smaller mosquito larvae are consumed whole, but larger ones have their internal contents sucked out, probably due to the difficulty of masticating their chitinous exoskeletons. Predatory larvae also attack pupae, seizing them by the tail and keeping them under water until they drown. Killed pupae are not eaten immediately, but left intact until partly decomposed and then eaten.

Predatory larvae have a thickened, comb-like modification of a group of the hairs on the medioventral aspect of the mouth brushes resembling those found in the predatory species Lutzia tigripes. After seizing their prey, Eretmapodites larvae hold it between the half-flexed head and the ventral surface of the thorax and consume it rapidly, devouring a large larva in about 10 minutes.

Medical importance

Eretmapodites species have been demonstrated to be laboratory vectors of yellow fever and chikungunya. Viruses isolated from wild-caught Eretmapodites include Rift Valley fever, Semliki forest, Spondweni, Nyando, Okola, Middleburg, Nkolbisson, and Bunyamwera viruses and an undefined viral agent, MTMP 131.

Species

Species listed by the Walter Reed Biosystematics Unit:

Eretmapodites adami Ferrara and Eouzan
Eretmapodites angolensis da Cunha Ramos and Ribeiro
Eretmapodites argyrurus Edwards
Eretmapodites brenguesi Rickenbach and Lombrici
Eretmapodites brottesi Rickenbach
Eretmapodites caillardi Rickenbach, Ferrara, and Eouzan
Eretmapodites chrysogaster Graham
Eretmapodites corbeti Hamon
Eretmapodites dracaenae Edwards (syn. Eretmapodites ferox Haddow)
Eretmapodites dundo da Cunha Ramos and Ribeiro
Eretmapodites eouzani Rickenbach and Lombrici
Eretmapodites ferrarai Rickenbach and Eouzan
Eretmapodites forcipulatus Edwards
Eretmapodites germaini Rickenbach and Eouzan
Eretmapodites gilletti van Someren
Eretmapodites grahami Edwards
Eretmapodites grenieri Hamon and van Someren
Eretmapodites haddowi van Someren
Eretmapodites hamoni Grjebine
Eretmapodites harperi van Someren
Eretmapodites hightoni van Someren
Eretmapodites inornatus Newstead
Eretmapodites intermedius Edwards
Eretmapodites jani Rickenbach and Lombrici
Eretmapodites lacani Rickenbach and Eouzan
Eretmapodites leucopous Graham
Eretmapodites mahaffyi van Someren
Eretmapodites marcelleae Adam and Hamon
Eretmapodites mattinglyi Hamon and van Someren
Eretmapodites melanopous Graham
Eretmapodites mortiauxi Cunha Ramos and Ribeiro
Eretmapodites oedipodeios Graham (syn. Eretmapodites stanleyi Edwards)
Eretmapodites parvipluma Edwards
Eretmapodites pauliani Grjebine
Eretmapodites penicillatus Edwards
Eretmapodites plioleucus Edwards
Eretmapodites ssp. brevis Edwards
Eretmapodites productus Edwards
Eretmapodites quinquevittatus Theobald (syn. Eretmapodites austenii Theobald, Eretmapodites condei Ventrillon, Eretmapodites ravissei Rickenbach and Eouzan)
Eretmapodites rickenbachi Ferrara and Eouzan
Eretmapodites salauni Rickenbach, Ferrara & Eouzan
Eretmapodites semisimplicipes Edwards
Eretmapodites silvestris Ingram & de Meillon (subsp. Eretmapodites conchobius Edwards)
Eretmapodites subsimplicipes Edwards
Eretmapodites tendeiroi da Cunha Ramos, Ribeiro and de Barros Machado
Eretmapodites tonsus Edwards
Eretmapodites vansomereni Hamon
Eretmapodites wansoni Edwards (subsp. Eretmapodites douceti Adam and Hamon)

References

Aedini
Mosquito genera
Taxa named by Frederick Vincent Theobald